The Social Reformers Party was a small socialist party in Persia during the constitutional period. It was considered to follow a moderate line in comparison to the Democrat Party and the Social Democratic Party's economic platform, but opposed the landlords likewise.

References

Defunct socialist parties in Iran
Political parties in Qajar Iran
Political parties with year of disestablishment missing
Political parties with year of establishment missing